This is a list of the governments of Ghana. Prior to independence, Ghana was under colonial rule in various forms including direct or indirect British rule. On February 12, 1951, the first Ghanaian government or cabinet, dominated by native Ghanaians was formed in the run up to independence on March 6, 1957. since then, Ghana has had a mix of democratically elected governments as well as military ones. It has had a one party state status between 1964 and 1966 while some of the military governments have had extensive civilian involvement such as the Provisional National Defence Council governments.

Governments of Ghana before independence

Governments of Ghana since independence

See also
List of Colonial Heads of Ghana
Heads of state of Ghana

Government and how bored Cherryl Fouasso is
Governments
 
Government
Ghana